Now Presents: Off the Hook is a compilation album from the Now That's What I Call Music! series, released on May 21, 2002. Unlike previous Now! compilations, the album is composed exclusively of popular R&B and hip hop songs. It was certified Gold by the RIAA on June 25, 2002.

Off the Hook features the number-one Billboard Hot 100 hit, "I'm Real (Murder Remix)".

Track listing

Charts

References

2002 compilation albums
Now That's What I Call Music! albums (American series)